Kand-e Bolaghi (also Romanized as Kand-e Bolāghī and Kand Bolāghī; also known as Gonbad Bolaghi, Kand Bulākhe, and Kand-e Bolāqī) is a village in Shirin Su Rural District, Shirin Su District, Kabudarahang County, Hamadan Province, Iran. At the 2006 census, its population was 221, in 47 families.

References 

Populated places in Kabudarahang County